DFW may refer to:

Businesses 
, an early twentieth century German aircraft manufacturer
Dutch FilmWorks, a film distributor
Duty Free World, a US-based in-flight shopping company

Government agencies 
Division of Fisheries and Wildlife (Massachusetts)
Kentucky Department of Fish and Wildlife Resources
Oregon Department of Fish and Wildlife

Other uses
Dallas–Fort Worth metroplex, in north Texas, United States
Dallas/Fort Worth International Airport, IATA airport code and FAA location identifier
David Foster Wallace (1962–2008), American novelist
Dhaka Fashion Week, a clothing festival in Bangladesh
Diffusion welding
Cosworth DFW, an automobile racing engine
"DFW" (Brooklyn Nine-Nine), a television episode
Deborah Frances-White (fl. 1996–present), Australian-British comedian, author and screenwriter